Leslie Willard Cranfill (May 18, 1899 – July 29, 1983) was an American football, basketball, and baseball coach. He served two stints as the head football coach at Hardin–Simmons University from 1930 to 1934, compiling a record of 21–22–4.

Head coaching record

College football

References

External links
 

1899 births
1983 deaths
Hardin–Simmons Cowboys baseball coaches
Hardin–Simmons Cowboys basketball coaches
Hardin–Simmons Cowboys football coaches
TCU Horned Frogs football coaches
High school football coaches in Texas
People from Mitchell County, Texas